Airports Company of South Africa Limited (ACSA) is a majority(94.6%) state-owned South African airport management company. Founded in 1993, ACSA operates nine of South Africa's airports. The company is headquartered at Aviation Park, Western Precinct Building, situated at O.R. Tambo International Airport in Kempton Park, Gauteng, South Africa.

History
All of South Africa's airports used to be owned and operated by the state until 23 July 1993, when nine airports were reassigned to ACSA. ACSA was then owned by the South African Government through the Department of Transport.

In 1998, Aeroporti di Roma bought 20% of ACSA's shares for R819 million. In 2005, the Public Investment Corporation, bought the 20% shares back from the Italian group.

In 2006, ACSA was part of a consortium that won the bid to manage the Chhatrapati Shivaji International Airport in Mumbai, India.

In 2012, ACSA signed a 20-year concession agreement to manage the São Paulo–Guarulhos International Airport in Brazil, a strategic alliance between two countries that organized the soccer world cup in recent years. The deal was signed through a consortium including Brazil's Invepar for 51% of the concession and at a cost of $9.2 billion.

In May 2016, ACSA finished installing a solar power plant near the Kimberley Airport as part of a broader plan to install solar farms in all of its regional airports.

Airports 
The following international airports are operated by ACSA:
 O.R. Tambo International Airport
 Cape Town International Airport
 King Shaka International Airport
 Bram Fischer International Airport
 Upington International Airport
 Chief Dawid Stuurman International Airport
 São Paulo Guarulhos International Airport, Brazil
 Chhatrapati Shivaji Maharaj International Airport, Mumbai, India (consortium with Bidvest and Airports Authority of India)

The following local airports are operated by ACSA:
 King Phalo Airport
 George Airport
 Kimberley Airport
 Mthatha Airport

Armed cash heist at OR Tambo 
On 25 March 2006 gunmen armed with AK-47s stole bags containing several million US dollars at O.R. Tambo International Airport. Three ACSA employees and six other individuals were arrested and appeared in court in connection with the heist.

References

External links
 ACSA home page

Airports in South Africa
Transport companies of South Africa
Airport operators
Companies based in Germiston